Jonesky Limited (天下出版有限公司) is a Hong Kong publisher of domestic Chinese manhua and translated, imported comics from Japan.  Several of their titles have been translated and released in English.  It was founded in 1989 by comics creator Ma Wing Shing, who remains its CEO, and in recent years its products have branched out to include collectible merchandise from its series and Comics Fans, a magazine aimed at girls.

Selected works
Domestic Chinese-language titles published by Jonesky include:
 Ma Wing Shing: Fung Wan, Black Leopard (黑豹), Ying Xiong Wu Lei
 Shiu Wan: My Prince (我的王子殿下), Mushroom College (蘑菇學園)
 Leung Wai Ka: Heaven Sword And Dragon Sabre (倚天屠龍記)
 Li Chi-Tak: The Stone God (石神)

Examples of imported Japanese titled translated and distributed by Jonesky include:
 Sailor Moon
 One Piece
 Slam Dunk
 Vagabond
 Cardcaptor Sakura
 Kare Kano
 Hayate the Combat Butler
 Shugo Chara!
 Over Rev!

References

External links
 Company Website

Comic book publishing companies of China